Mo' Mega is the second solo studio album by American hip hop artist Mr. Lif. It was released by Definitive Jux on June 13, 2006. It peaked at number 27 on the Billboard Heatseekers Albums chart, as well as number 31 on the Independent Albums chart.

Title
In the album's liner notes, Mr. Lif wrote:

Critical reception

At Metacritic, which assigns a weighted average score out of 100 to reviews from mainstream critics, the album received an average score of 75, based on 22 reviews, indicating "generally favorable reviews".

John Bush of AllMusic gave the album 3.5 stars out of 5, saying: "With political tracks and comedy and confessionals, Lif easily covers more ground than virtually any other rapper on record, and he makes his tracks entertaining, but he occasionally falls prey to a common trap -- educating the listeners but not enlightening them."

Track listing

Personnel
Credits adapted from liner notes.

 Mr. Lif – vocals, production (6, 7) 
 El-P – production (1, 2, 3, 4, 5, 8, 9, 10), vocals (5), additional vocals (9)
 DJ Relm – turntables (2, 4)
 Aesop Rock – vocals (5)
 Murs – vocals (6)
 Edan – co-production (6)
 Blueprint – vocals (9)
 Akrobatik – vocals (9)
 DJ Big Wiz – turntables (9)
 Nick Toth – production (11)
 Michelle Shaprow – additional vocals (11)

Charts

References

External links
 

2006 albums
Mr. Lif albums
Definitive Jux albums
Albums produced by El-P